Předklášteří is a municipality and village in Brno-Country District in the South Moravian Region of the Czech Republic. It has about 1,400 inhabitants.

Administrative parts
The hamlet of Závist is an administrative part of Předklášteří.

Geography
It is situated on the right bank of the Svratka River, at the confluence of the rivers Svratka and Loučka and the stream Besének.

Předklášteří lies in the Křižanov Highlands.

History
The first written mention of the Předklášteří area is from 1233, when the convent was founded. The first written mention of the settlement itself is from 1530. 

Předklášteří was joined to Tišnov in 1953–1990. Since 1990 it has been a separate municipality.

Culture
The Porta coeli Convent is often used to hold concerts of sacred music.

Sights
The main historical and tourist attraction is the Porta coeli Convent, a 13th-century women monastery with unique architecture.

Gallery

References

External links

Villages in Brno-Country District